Joko Ribowo (born 15 March 1989) is an Indonesian professional footballer who plays as a goalkeeper for Liga 1 club Barito Putera.

Club career

Arema F.C.
He was signed for Arema to play in Liga 1 in the 2018 season. Ribowo made his league debut on 27 April 2018 in a match against Persipura Jayapura at the Kanjuruhan Stadium, Malang.

PSIS Semarang
He was signed for PSIS Semarang to play in Liga 1 in the middle 2018 season. Ribowo made his league debut on 4 August 2018 in a match against Bali United at the Kapten I Wayan Dipta Stadium, Gianyar.

PS Barito Putera
Ribowo was signed for Barito Putera to play in Liga 1 in the 2022–23 season. He made his league debut on 23 July 2022 in a match against Madura United at the Gelora Ratu Pamelingan Stadium, Pamekasan.

References

External links
 Joko Ribowo at Soccerway
 Joko Ribowo at Liga Indonesia

1989 births
Living people
Indonesian footballers
Indonesian Premier League players
Liga 1 (Indonesia) players
Persema Malang players
Persijap Jepara players
PS Barito Putera players
Madura United F.C. players
Mitra Kukar players
Arema F.C. players
PSIS Semarang players
Association football goalkeepers
People from Demak Regency
Sportspeople from Central Java